The Mercedes-Benz EQE SUV is an upcoming all-electric SUV which was revealed on October 16, 2022, alongside the Mercedes-AMG EQE SUV performance variant. The automaker will display the entire EQ range in the gardens of the Musée Rodin in Paris on October 16 and 17, alongside concepts that will preview the company's electric future.

The SUV follows the same design language as the rest of the vehicles in the EQ sub-brand.

Overview

The EQE SUV is positioned between the EQC and EQS SUV, and will basically be a utility version of the EQE sedan.

Models

References

Cars introduced in 2022
EQE SUV
Production electric cars
EQE SUV